Wiederkehr is a Swiss-German surname. Notable people with the surname include:

Daniel Wiederkehr (born 1989), Swiss rower
Gustav Wiederkehr (1905–1972), Swiss football administrator
Josef Wiederkehr (born 1970), Swiss businessman and politician
Johann Andreas Wiederkehr, Swiss-American winemaker

See also
Wiederkehr Village, Arkansas, a city in Franklin County, Arkansas, United States

Swiss-German surnames